The Retreat to Montalban occurred during the Philippine Revolution after the 1897 Battle of Naic southwest of Cavite when Philippine General Emilio Aguinaldo's and his forces retreated to Puray, Montalban on June 14. The Spanish pursued the Katipunero forces retreating towards central Luzon, killing many of the revolutionaries. However, the retreat finally ended when Aguinaldo and the Filipinos won the Battle of Mount Puray, from which he would make his temporary headquarters, relocating it again to Norzagaray and Angat, until finally reaching the caves of Biak-na-Bato on June 24, 1897 and making it the new revolutionary headquarters.

Prelude 
The revolutionary forces in Cavite were exhausted and failing against the freshly reinforced Spanish troops that went from Manila to Laguna. After numerous defeats in Imus and Silang, along with the execution of Andres Bonifacio, the Filipino revolutionaries have lost their morale and their willingness to fight, causing some to surrender to the Spanish.

The retreat 
According to the memoir Aguinaldo wrote called "The True Version of the Philippine Revolution", he stated that the Battle of Naic on May 3, 1897 was fought successfully by his troops on a river in Naic which held the Spanish forces before the retreat on mid May. After the battle, they then proceeded to their headquarters on Talisay, Batangas before being attacked by Spanish forces on May 30 which made the revolutionaries retreat. The retreat was made from Paliparan, a village belonging to Perez Dasmariñas, and then went through Malapad-na-Bato and Mariquina, and by June 10 they were spotted to be near Mount Puray. They encountered Spanish troops while they were camping on June 14 and were attacked. However, the revolutionaries were successful in this battle, and hence the long retreat finally ended. They then proceeded on a long march towards their hill bases in Bulacan, namely Norzagaray, Angat and then finally the cave at Biak-na-Bato in San Miguel in the province of Bulacan by June 24, where the place was deemed far away from the front lines. From then on they made Biak-na-Bato as the new headquarters of the revolution, setting up a republican government and handing out orders across the Philippine islands, extending the revolution from just the original eight provinces first to revolt against Spain to include all of the Philippines.

References

Montalban
History of Rizal
Montalban